In Greek mythology and history, there were at least eleven men named Medon (Ancient Greek: Μέδων, gen.: Μέδοντος means "lord' or "ruler").

 Medon, one of the Tyrrhenian pirates who attempted to enslave Dionysus and were changed into fish or dolphin.
Medon, a centaur at the wedding of Pirithous and Hippodamia.
Medon, one of the Dolionians, who was killed by the Argonauts.
Medon, son of Eteoclus and accordingly a participant in the war of the Epigoni.
Medon, the son of Pylades and Electra and brother of Strophius.
Medon, one of the Achaean Leaders and half-brother of Ajax the Lesser. He was the son of Oileus, king of Locris, by Rhene or Alcimache. He lived in Phylace, to where he had to flee after he had killed a relative of his stepmother Eriopis. In the Trojan War, Medon took over Philoctetes' army after the latter was bitten by a snake and left on Lemnos because the wound festered and smelled bad. Medon was killed by Aeneas.
Medon, a "cunning craftsman" of Cilla, husband of Iphianassa and father of Metalcas and Zechis, of whom the former was slain in the Trojan War by Neoptolemus, and the latter by Teucer.
Medon, son of Antenor and Theano, thus brother of Crino, Acamas, Agenor, Antheus, Archelochus, Coön, Demoleon, Eurymachus, Glaucus, Helicaon, Iphidamas, Laodamas, Laodocus, Polybus and Thersilochus. Medon was killed by Philoctetes, and later Aeneas met him in the Underworld.
Medon, the faithful herald of Odysseus in Homer's Odyssey. Following the advice of his son Telemachus, Odysseus spares Medon's life after killing the suitors of Penelope who had been plaguing his halls in his homeland of Ithaca. Medon attempts to return the favor by speaking on behalf of his master, claiming that Odysseus' violence was not unwarranted by the gods. 
Medon, the "cruel" suitor of Penelope who came from Dulichium along with other 56 wooers. He, with the other suitors, was slain by Odysseus with the aid of Eumaeus, Philoetius, and Telemachus.
 Medon (Μήδων), a son of Ceisus and grandson of Temenus. He was a king of Argos but his powers were limited to the minimum in favor of the people's self-government.
 Medon, son of Codrus, was the first archon of Athens. He was lame in one foot, which was why his brother Neileus would not let him rule, but the Delphian oracle bestowed the kingdom upon Medon.

See also
 Medon (disambiguation)

Notes

References 
Apollodorus, The Library with an English Translation by Sir James George Frazer, F.B.A., F.R.S. in 2 Volumes, Cambridge, MA, Harvard University Press; London, William Heinemann Ltd. 1921. ISBN 0-674-99135-4. Online version at the Perseus Digital Library. Greek text available from the same website.
Dictys Cretensis, from The Trojan War. The Chronicles of Dictys of Crete and Dares the Phrygian translated by Richard McIlwaine Frazer, Jr. (1931-). Indiana University Press. 1966. Online version at the Topos Text Project.
Gaius Julius Hyginus, Fabulae from The Myths of Hyginus translated and edited by Mary Grant. University of Kansas Publications in Humanistic Studies. Online version at the Topos Text Project.
Gaius Valerius Flaccus, Argonautica translated by Mozley, J H. Loeb Classical Library Volume 286. Cambridge, MA, Harvard University Press; London, William Heinemann Ltd. 1928. Online version at theio.com.
Gaius Valerius Flaccus, Argonauticon. Otto Kramer. Leipzig. Teubner. 1913. Latin text available at the Perseus Digital Library.
Homer, The Iliad with an English Translation by A.T. Murray, Ph.D. in two volumes. Cambridge, MA., Harvard University Press; London, William Heinemann, Ltd. 1924. . Online version at the Perseus Digital Library.
Homer, Homeri Opera in five volumes. Oxford, Oxford University Press. 1920. . Greek text available at the Perseus Digital Library.
Homer. Odyssey. Trans. Stanley Lombardo. Canada: Hackett Publishing Company, Inc., 2000. Print.
Pausanias, Description of Greece with an English Translation by W.H.S. Jones, Litt.D., and H.A. Ormerod, M.A., in 4 Volumes. Cambridge, MA, Harvard University Press; London, William Heinemann Ltd. 1918. . Online version at the Perseus Digital Library
Pausanias, Graeciae Descriptio. 3 vols. Leipzig, Teubner. 1903.  Greek text available at the Perseus Digital Library.
Publius Ovidius Naso, The Epistles of Ovid. London. J. Nunn, Great-Queen-Street; R. Priestly, 143, High-Holborn; R. Lea, Greek-Street, Soho; and J. Rodwell, New-Bond-Street. 1813. Online version at the Perseus Digital Library.
Publius Ovidius Naso. Amores, Epistulae, Medicamina faciei femineae, Ars amatoria, Remedia amoris. Edition by R. Ehwald; Rudolphi Merkelii; Leipzig. B. G. Teubner. 1907. Latin text available at the Perseus Digital Library.
Publius Ovidius Naso, Metamorphoses translated by Brookes More (1859-1942). Boston, Cornhill Publishing Co. 1922. Online version at the Perseus Digital Library.
Publius Ovidius Naso, Metamorphoses. Hugo Magnus. Gotha (Germany). Friedr. Andr. Perthes. 1892. Latin text available at the Perseus Digital Library.
Publius Vergilius Maro, Aeneid. Theodore C. Williams. trans. Boston. Houghton Mifflin Co. 1910. Online version at the Perseus Digital Library.
Publius Vergilius Maro, Bucolics, Aeneid, and Georgics. J. B. Greenough. Boston. Ginn & Co. 1900. Latin text available at the Perseus Digital Library.
Quintus Smyrnaeus, The Fall of Troy translated by Way. A. S. Loeb Classical Library Volume 19. London: William Heinemann, 1913. Online version at theio.com
Quintus Smyrnaeus, The Fall of Troy. Arthur S. Way. London: William Heinemann; New York: G.P. Putnam's Sons. 1913. Greek text available at the Perseus Digital Library.
 Tzetzes, John, Allegories of the Iliad translated by Goldwyn, Adam J. and Kokkini, Dimitra. Dumbarton Oaks Medieval Library, Harvard University Press, 2015.

Centaurs
Achaean Leaders
Characters in the Odyssey
Characters in Book VI of the Aeneid
Trojans
People of the Trojan War
Eponymous archons
Locrian characters in Greek mythology
Dionysus in mythology
Thessalian mythology
Metamorphoses into animals in Greek mythology